Sa'adatullah Khan I or Sa'adatullah Khan was Nawab of Carnatic (r.1710–1732) and founder of Nawayath dynasty. He was an adventurer from Konkan in Maharashtra.

Life
Mohammed Sayyid was the last mughal governor who was appointed as Nawab of Carnatic with the title Saadatullah Khan I and moved his capital from Gingee to Arcot. Like his predecessors, he also enjoyed control over all the territories of the Emperor, in the South. He also carried his contribution wars to the gates of Srirangapatnam and collected "peshkash" or tribute from its rulers.

In 1711, he started demanding the five villages granted in 1708 to the East India Company on the basis of insufficient grants. The English resisted and even prepared for a war. Saadatullah Khan demanded Egmore, Tondiarpet and Purasawalkam also. But the matter was settled amicably by the good offices of Sunkurama and Rayasam Papaiya, the Company's Chief Merchants.

After the death of Aurungazeb, due to the inability of his successor, the control of Delhi became weak. Having no children, Saadatullah Khan adopted his brother Ghulam Ali Khan's son Dost Ali Khan as his own and nominated him as successor. He had obtained the private consent of the Mughal Emperor for this step even without communicating his desire to the Nizam of Deccan.

Though the Nizam claimed supremacy over the Nawab, his control became very weak and he could not prevent the office of the Nawab from becoming hereditary and so he wisely restricted himself to claiming the right of giving his formal approval to their appointment. Thus Saadatullah Khan became a senior and independent ruler of the Carnatic extending from the River Godicame on the North to the borders of Travancore on the South and enclosed between the Eastern Ghats and the Sea.

Governor Collect, obtained from him in 1717, the firman for Tiruvottiyur, Sattangadu, Kathiwakam, Vysarpady and Nungambakkam.

Titles held
Dewan under Nawab Daud Khan.

See also
Nawabs of Arcot

References 

Nawabs of the Carnatic
Year of birth missing
1732 deaths
Indian Muslims
Mughal Empire